The 2017 Brest Challenger was a professional tennis tournament played on hard courts. It was the third edition of the tournament which was part of the 2017 ATP Challenger Tour. It took place in Brest, France between 23 and 29 October 2017.

Singles main-draw entrants

Seeds

 1 Rankings are as of 16 October 2017.

Other entrants
The following players received wildcards into the singles main draw:
  Geoffrey Blancaneaux
  David Guez
  Ugo Humbert
  Corentin Moutet

The following players received entry into the singles main draw as special exempts:
  Matteo Donati
  Stefanos Tsitsipas

The following player received entry into the singles main draw as an alternate:
  Gleb Sakharov

The following players received entry from the qualifying draw:
  Tristan Lamasine
  Illya Marchenko
  Gianni Mina
  Yannik Reuter

The following player received entry as a lucky loser:
  Andrea Arnaboldi

Champions

Singles

  Corentin Moutet def.  Stefanos Tsitsipas 6–2, 7–6(10–8).

Doubles

  Sander Arends /  Antonio Šančić def.  Scott Clayton /  Divij Sharan 6–4, 7–5.

References

2017 ATP Challenger Tour
Brest Challenger
2017 in French tennis